The Gods were an English rock band founded in 1965. The original band members included Mick Taylor (later with John Mayall's Bluesbreakers and the Rolling Stones), Brian Glascock, his brother John (later with Jethro Tull), keyboardist Ken Hensley (later with Uriah Heep) and Joe Konas. Lee Kerslake (drums) joined in 1967 and would later also play in Uriah Heep. Greg Lake (later with King Crimson and Emerson, Lake & Palmer) joined in 1967 and left the band after approximately one year.

Career
Taylor and the Glascock brothers were schoolmates from Hatfield and had been playing together as The Juniors (or The Strangers), a band they formed in 1962. Also part of this band were Malcolm Collins (vocals) and Alan Shacklock (guitar). They eventually signed with EMI / Columbia Records. Their first 7" single (Columbia DB7339) appeared in 1964 ("There's a Pretty Girl"/"Pocket Size"). In 1965, the line-up changed. Mick Taylor continued to play guitar and teamed up with Hensley (organ/vocals). They also added Konas (guitar/vocals) and changed their name to "The Gods".

In 1966, the Gods opened for Cream at the Starlite Ballroom in Wembley, London.
A single ("Come On Down to My Boat Baby"/"Garage Man") was recorded in early 1967 on Polydor Records. At this point the line-up included Mick Taylor, Ken Hensley, John Glascock, and Joe Konas.

In May 1967, Taylor got a call from John Mayall who was looking for a new guitarist to replace Peter Green. When Taylor joined the Bluesbreakers, he left behind a faltering blues band. The band sought to revive their fortunes on the club/college circuit. They relocated to London and secured a residency at The Marquee. John Glascock (bass) was replaced by Paul Newton in June 1967 and then by Greg Lake. But the latter was too talented for the backing role they had him in so he soon left to join King Crimson in the summer of 1968. The band had to re-group again and John Glascock was asked to return.

With Glascock back in the fold, they recorded a couple of progressive rock albums and a few singles. Of their singles, "Hey! Bulldog", a Beatles track, is their best known, and both sides have been included on the compilation album, The Great British Psychedelic Trip Vol. 3. The band played an amalgam of psychedelia and progressivism. Tracks like "Towards the Skies" and "Time and Eternity" from their 1968 album Genesis are full of heavy ploughing Hammond organ and distorted guitar riffs and Ken Hensley's unique and rather dramatic vocals add a further dimension.

Most of the Gods' material is fairly typical late 1960s pop/rock, epitomised by songs like "Radio Show" and "Yes I Cry".  There are shades of Vanilla Fudge on their cover of the West Side Story extract "Maria". On a few tracks like "Candlelight" and "Real Love Guaranteed", there is an inkling of the heavier sound Hensley and Kerslake would propagate in their next venture, Uriah Heep.

The Gods were the successors of the Rolling Stones at the Marquee Club in London.

After recording two albums, Genesis (1968) and To Samuel a Son (1969), they signed with a new record company and formed Toe Fat, which also lasted two years and two albums. In 1970, they published an album under the pseudonym Head Machine, titled Orgasm with Ken Hensley on keys, guitars and vocals, John Glascock on bass, Joe Konas on guitars and Lee Kerslake on drums.

Personnel
 Ken Hensley - organ, guitars, vocals (1965-1969, died 2020)
 Joe Konas - guitars, vocals (1965-1969)
 John Glascock - bass (1965-1967, 1968-1969; died 1979)
 Mick Taylor - guitars (1965-1967)
 Brian Glascock - drums (1965-1967)
 Lee Kerslake - drums (1967-1969; died 2020)
 Greg Lake - bass (1967-1968; died 2016)
 Paul Newton - bass (1967)
 Alan Shacklock - guitars (1969)

Discography

Albums
 Genesis (October 1968), Columbia SCX 6286, re-issued 1994 on Repertoire Records
 To Samuel a Son (February 1970), Columbia SCX 6372, re-issued 1995 on Repertoire Records
 Orgasm (as Head Machine) (1970), Audio Archives AACD014
 Best of the Gods (compilation CD)

Singles
 "Come On Down to My Boat Baby" / "Garage Man" (Polydor 56168)
 "Baby's Rich" / "Somewhere in the Street" (Columbia DB 8486)
 "Hey Bulldog" / "Real Love Guaranteed" (Columbia  DB 8544)
 "Maria" (from West Side Story) / "Long Time Sad Time Bad Time" (Columbia  DB 8572)

References

External links
The Gods Biography

Musical groups established in 1965
Musical groups established in 1969
English rock music groups
Uriah Heep (band)
1965 establishments in England
1969 disestablishments in England